George Joseph Martin (26 June 1931 – 18 May 2017) was a New Zealand rugby league footballer who played as a  in the 1950s. He played in the NSWRFL premiership for North Sydney.

Early life
Martin was born and raised in Lower Hutt, New Zealand.  Before playing rugby league, Martin excelled at discus, shot put and javelin.  In 1950, Martin qualified for the 1950 British Empire Games in Auckland and competed in the pole vault.  Also in 1950, Martin played for the Wellington rugby union side against the British Lions.  Martin was tipped to have a bright career in the game before deciding to switch codes and play rugby league.

Playing career
Martin began his first grade career in 1952 with North Sydney.  Martin was a member of the Norths sides which reached the preliminary finals in 1952 and 1953 and qualified for the finals in 1954.  Martin also represented New South Wales City and played an exhibition match against the American All Stars in 1953.  After leaving North Sydney, Martin returned to New Zealand and played rugby league in the local competitions.  He died on 18 May 2017.

References

1931 births
2017 deaths
Athletes (track and field) at the 1950 British Empire Games
City New South Wales rugby league team players
Commonwealth Games competitors for New Zealand
New Zealand male pole vaulters
North Sydney Bears players
Rugby league centres
Rugby league players from Lower Hutt